The Craxi I Cabinet was the cabinet of the Italian government which held office from 4 August 1983 until 1 August 1986, for a total of 1,093 days, or 2 years, 11 months and 28 days.

Party breakdown

Ministers and other members
Italian Socialist Party (PSI): prime minister, 5 ministers and 14 undersecretaries
Christian Democracy (DC): deputy prime minister, 15 ministers and 31 undersecretaries
Italian Republican Party (PRI): 3 ministers and 6 undersecretaries
Italian Democratic Socialist Party (PSDI): 3 ministers and 5 undersecretaries
Italian Liberal Party (PLI): 2 ministers and 4 undersecretaries

Composition

References

Italian governments
Cabinets established in 1983
Cabinets disestablished in 1986
1983 establishments in Italy
1986 disestablishments in Italy